Cades is an unincorporated community in northern Williamsburg County, South Carolina, United States.  It is the birthplace of former Governor Robert Evander McNair.

Originally named Camp Ridge, it changed to Cades when the post office was established in 1887. The community was named after C. W. Cades, an early postmaster, or possibly after early postmaster Vernal Glenn Arnette's (1885-1974) grandfather, Cade Arnette (1823-1864).

References

Unincorporated communities in South Carolina
Unincorporated communities in Williamsburg County, South Carolina